The episodes from the nineteenth season of the anime series Naruto: Shippuden are based on Part II for Masashi Kishimoto's manga series. The anime original season focuses on the Chūnin Exams that occur after Part I. The episodes are directed by Hayato Date, and produced by Pierrot and TV Tokyo. The nineteenth season aired from January to May 2015.

The season would make its English television debut on Adult Swim's Toonami programming block and premiere on June 12 to October 9, 2022.

The season contains four musical themes: two openings and endings. The first opening theme,  by KANA-BOON, is used from episode 394 to 405. The second opening theme,  by Yamazaru, is used from episode 406 to 413. The first ending theme, "Spinning World" by Diana Garnet, is used from episode 394 to 405.  The second ending theme,  by sana, is used from episode 406 to 413. 


Episode list

Home releases

Japanese

English

References
General

Specific

2015 Japanese television seasons
Shippuden Season 19